Mastigodiaptomus amatitlanensis is a species of calanoid copepod in the family Diaptomidae.

References

Diaptomidae
Articles created by Qbugbot
Crustaceans described in 1941